135 Squadron may refer to:

 No. 135 Squadron RCAF, see list of Royal Canadian Air Force squadrons
 135 Squadron (Israel)
 No. 135 Squadron RAF, United Kingdom
 135th Aero Squadron, United States Army Air Service
 135th Airlift Squadron, United States Air Force
 VAQ-135, United States Navy